The 2012–13 Houston Cougars men's basketball team represented the University of Houston during the 2012–13 NCAA Division I men's basketball season. The Cougars, led by third year head coach James Dickey, played their home games at Hofheinz Pavilion and participated as a member of Conference USA. The season marked the last for the Cougars as a member of C-USA as they joined the American Athletic Conference in July 2013.

The Cougars ended the regular season with a 3-game winning streak and a 7–9 conference record. This placed the team as the number six seed in the C-USA tournament and a matchup with cross-town rival Rice in the first round. The Cougars won the game 72–67 and advanced to the quarterfinals to face UTEP where they lost 69–80.

After the UTEP loss, UH officials looked into options for the team to play in either the CBI or CIT postseason tournaments to give the young team more experience. The Cougars were later invited to participate in the 2013 College Basketball Invitational and paired up with Texas in the first round. Houston defeated the Longhorns and advanced to the quarterfinals where they lost to George Mason in overtime.

A highlight of the 2012–13 schedule was that it featured matchups with five former Southwest Conference rivals (Rice, SMU, TCU, Texas, and Texas A&M).

Roster

Schedule

|-
!colspan=9 style="background:#CC0000; color:#FFFFFF;"| Exhibition

|-
!colspan=9 style="background:#CC0000; color:#FFFFFF;"| Non-Conference Regular Season

|-
!colspan=9 style="background:#CC0000; color:#FFFFFF;"| Conference USA Regular Season

|-
!colspan=9 style="background:#CC0000; color:#FFFFFF;"| 2013 Conference USA men's basketball tournament

|-
!colspan=9 style="background:#CC0000; color:#FFFFFF;"| 2013 College Basketball Invitational

References

Houston
Houston Cougars men's basketball seasons
Houston
Houston Cougars Men's Basketball
Houston Cougars Men's Basketball